Players and pairs who neither have high enough rankings nor receive wild cards may participate in a qualifying tournament held one week before the annual Wimbledon Tennis Championships.

Seeds

  Jamie Holmes /  Andrew Painter (qualified)
  Michael Kohlmann /  Myles Wakefield (second round)
  Stefano Pescosolido /  Filippo Veglio (first round)
  Jim Thomas /  Rogier Wassen (first round)
  Alejandro Hernández /  Bernardo Martínez (second round)
  Petr Luxa /  David Škoch (qualified)

Qualifiers

  Jamie Holmes /  Andrew Painter
  Ross Matheson /  Nick Weal
  Petr Luxa /  David Škoch

Qualifying draw

First qualifier

Second qualifier

Third qualifier

External links

1998 Wimbledon Championships – Men's draws and results at the International Tennis Federation

Men's Doubles Qualifying
Wimbledon Championship by year – Men's doubles qualifying